Benjamin Paddock may refer to:
Benjamin Henry Paddock (1828–1891), bishop of Massachusetts in the Episcopal Church
Benjamin Hoskins Paddock (1926–1998), American bank robber and con man
Benjamin G. Paddock (1827–1900), American businessman and politician

See also
Paddock (surname)